Lightnin' is a 1925 American silent comedy film directed by John Ford. It was based on a successful play of the same name. The original run of the play started in 1918 at the Gaiety Theatre (New York) and continued for 1,291 performances, breaking the record for longest running play at that time. The film was remade in 1930 by Henry King for Fox as an early talkie starring Will Rogers with support from Louise Dresser and Joel McCrea.

Plot
As described in a film magazine reviews, war veteran Lightnin’ Bill Jones is a likeable old man who has a friend in every acquaintance, and loves his dog and his liquor. His wife and he operate a hotel. When some swindlers from the city seek to get possession of the property, Lightnin’ Bill Jones sees through their scheme and refuses to sign the deeds. His wife construes his refusal as a malicious move and sues him for divorce. In the courtroom, she relents and, at the moment before the decree is handed down, they become reconciled.

Cast

References

External links

1925 films
1925 comedy films
Silent American comedy films
American silent feature films
American black-and-white films
Films directed by John Ford
Fox Film films
Films with screenplays by Frances Marion
1920s American films